Mount Shirley is an ice-covered mountain whose east face is marked by a prominent cirque, surmounting the west side of the mouth of Land Glacier in Marie Byrd Land. Discovered by the United States Antarctic Service (USAS) (1939–41) and named for Charles C. Shirley, chief photographer at the USAS West Base.

Mountains of Marie Byrd Land